Granowo  is a village in Grodzisk Wielkopolski County, Greater Poland Voivodeship, in west-central Poland. It is the seat of the gmina (administrative district) called Gmina Granowo.

The village has a population of 2,031.

References

Granowo